A glacial lake is a body of water with origins from glacier activity. They are formed when a glacier erodes the land and then melts, filling the depression created by the glacier.

Formation
Near the end of the last glacial period, roughly 10,000 years ago, glaciers began to retreat. A retreating glacier often left behind large deposits of ice in hollows between drumlins or hills. As the ice age ended, these melted to create lakes. This is apparent in the Lake District in Northwestern England where post-glacial sediments are normally between 4 and 6 metres deep. These lakes are often surrounded by drumlins, along with other evidence of the glacier such as moraines, eskers and erosional features such as striations and chatter marks.

These lakes are clearly visible in aerial photos of landforms in regions that were glaciated during the last ice age.

The formation and characteristics of glacial lakes vary between location and can be classified into glacial erosion lake, ice-blocked lake, moraine-dammed lake, other glacial lake, supraglacial lake, and subglacial lake.

Glacial lakes and changing climate 
Since the glaciation of the Little Ice Age, Earth has lost more than 50% of its glaciers. This along with the current increase in retreating glaciers caused by climate change has created a shift from frozen to liquid water, increasing the extent and volume of glacial lakes around the world. Most glacial lakes present today can be found in Asia, Europe, and North America. The area which will see the greatest increase in lake formation is the Southern Tibetan Plateau region from debris covered glaciers. This increase in glacial lake formation also indicates an increase in occurrence of glacial lake outburst flood events caused by damming and subsequent breaking of moraine and ice.

Sediments
The amount of sediment found in glacial lakes varies, and has a general stratigraphic sequence of organic muds, glacial clays, silty clays, and sands based on time of formation.

Over time the glacial lake sediments are subjected to change. As seen in the English Lake District, the layers of the sediments at the bottom of the lakes contain evidence of the rate of erosion.  The elemental make up of the sediments are not associated with the lakes themselves, but by the migration of the elements within the soil, such as iron and manganese.

The distribution of these elements, within the lake bed, are attributed to the condition of the drainage basin and the chemical composition of the water.

Sediment deposition can also be influenced by animal activity; including the distribution of biochemical elements, which are elements that are found in organic organisms, such as phosphorus and sulfur.

The amount of halogens and boron found in the sediments accompanies a change in erosional activity.  The rate of deposition reflects the amount of halogen and boron in the deposited sediments.

The scouring action of the glaciers pulverizes minerals in the rock over which the glacier passes. These pulverized minerals become sediment at the bottom of the lake, and some of the rock flour becomes suspended in the water column. These suspended minerals support a large population of algae, making the water appear green.

Biotic ecosystem

Biodiversity and productivity tend to be lower in glacial lakes as only cold-tolerant and cold-adapted species can withstand their harsh conditions. Glacial rock flour and low nutrient levels create an oligotrophic environment where few species of plankton, fish and benthic organisms reside.

Before becoming a lake the first stages of glacial recession melt enough freshwater to form a shallow lagoon. In the case of Iceland's Jökulsárlón glacial lagoon located on the edge of the Atlantic Ocean, tides bring in an array of fish species to the edge of the glacier. These fish attract an abundance of predators from birds to marine mammals, that are searching for food. These predators include fauna such as, seals, arctic terns and arctic skua.

Glacial lakes that have been formed for a long period of time have a more diverse ecosystem of fauna originating form neighboring tributaries or other glacial refugia. For example, many native species of the great lakes basin entered via the Mississippi basin refugia within the past 14,000 years.

Societal perspectives

Glacial lakes act as fresh water storage for the replenishing of a region's water supply and serve as potential electricity producers from hydropower.

Glacial lakes' aesthetic nature can also stimulate economic activity through the attraction of the tourism industry. Thousands of tourists visit the Jökulsárlón glacial lagoon in Iceland annually to take part in commercial boat tours and every two to four years thousands visit the Argentino glacial lake in Argentina to witness the collapse of the cyclically formed arch of ice from the Perito Moreno glacier, making it one of the largest travel destinations in Patagonia.

Gallery

See also 

 Proglacial lake
 Moraine-dammed lake
 Subglacial lake
 Zungenbecken

References 

 
Lakes by type
Glacial landforms